CALLERLAB is the international association of square dance callers, and is the largest square dance association in the United States. CALLERLAB provides guidance and education, certifying caller coaches, maintaining standardized lists of calls and definitions, and generally promoting the square dance activity. After some initial work started in 1971, it was officially established in 1974 by several members of the Square Dance Hall of Fame. Callerlab makes it so people can dance anywhere in the world with uniform dance calls.

Callers from all over the world, including Saudi Arabia, Japan, Germany, and England, are members of the organization, which hosts and annual convention.

The average age of Callerlab members is 65.

Functions
Maintains a suggested list of dancing programs, from Mainstream through C-3A. Each program contains a list of standardized square dance calls and concepts, with official definitions.
Provides BMI/ASCAP licensing to its members
Provides liability insurance for dance events

References

Square dance
Dance organizations
Organizations established in 1974